HIV-mobil is Austria's sole service organization for home health nursing dedicated to people with  HIV and AIDS. The organization was founded in 1999 and is based in Vienna.


History and goals 

The founders of HIV-mobil were health care specialist Beate Dannoritzer, nurse Günter Geyer and social worker Thomas Fröhlich. Dannoritzer has chaired the association since its foundation. Its medical director of many years standing is HIV specialist  Wolfgang Steflitsch; the care department is headed by Eva Stifter.

From 1999 to 2004 the organization was funded solely by Austria's most prestigious charity event, the Life Ball. Since 2005, Life Ball and City of Vienna share the financing of HIV-mobil. In its Guiding Principles the organization calls its primary goal to be an integral home care and medical services organization, borne by respect toward all people taken care of — ″regardless of age, religion, descent, social position or sexual orientation without any moral judgement.″

HIV-mobil has been networking successfully on a national and international basis, is cooperating with all Viennese AIDS clinics, with AIDS help organizations in Austria, such as Lighthouse Wien, as well as with several assisted living organizations in Vienna.

Furthermore, the organization has developed guidelines for the treatment of people with  HIV and AIDS in home care and has been supporting actively the requests of national health organizations at the XVIII International AIDS Conference that took place in Vienna in 2010.

Accolades 
 2010 Health Award of the City of Vienna

References

External links 
 Website HIV-mobil
 Austria Presse Agency, retrieved March 19, 2015
 Falter, retrieved March 19, 2015

HIV/AIDS organizations
Charities based in Austria
Organisations based in Vienna
Nursing organizations
Medical and health organisations based in Austria